State Route 136 (SR-136) is a  long state highway in the U.S. state of Utah. It runs from a junction with U.S. Route 50 (US-50) and SR-125 to US-6.

Route description 
The route begins at an intersection with US-50 and SR-125. West of the SR-136, this road is signed as US-50, and eastward it is signed as SR-125. The continuation beyond this point southward is also signed as US-50. From this intersection, SR-136 heads north through a desert landscape and passes the Delta Municipal Airport. It turns slightly northwest to meet US 6, which is oriented southwest-northeast.

History 
A former designation for the route was established in 1933 and ran from SR-259 near Kanab and headed north to SR-11 (now US-89) at Alton Junction near Alton. This designation was removed by 1969. The current designation was implemented by 1985.

Major intersections

References 

136
 136